Coniophis is an extinct genus of snakes from the late Cretaceous period. The type species, Coniophis precedes, was about 7 cm long and had snake-like teeth and body form, with a skull and a largely lizard-like bone structure. It probably ate small vertebrates. The fossil remains of Coniophis were first discovered at the end of the 19th century in the Lance Formation of the US state of Wyoming, and were described in 1892 by Othniel Charles Marsh. For the genus Coniophis, a number of other species have been described. Their affiliation is, however, poorly secured, mostly based on vertebrae descriptions from only a few fossils.

Fossil distribution 
Fossils of Coniophis have been found in:

Cretaceous
 Milk River and Frenchman Formations, Canada (Alberta, Saskatchewan)
 Intertrappean Beds, India
 Wadi Milk Formation, Sudan
 United States
 Hell Creek Formation, Montana
 Fruitland Formation, New Mexico
 Naturita, Cedar Mountain, Straight Cliffs, Kaiparowits and Wahweap Formations, Utah
 Lance Formation, Wyoming

Paleocene
 Santa Lucía Formation (Tiupampan), Bolivia
 Jbel Guersif Formation, Morocco
 Fort Union Formation, Montana, United States

Eocene
 Itaboraí Formation, Brazil
 France 
 Aït Ouarhitane Formation, Morocco 
 United States 
 Chadron Formation, North Dakota
 Bridger, Wagon Bed and Wasatch Formations, Wyoming

References

Further reading 
 Adriana María Albino:  In: Ameghiniana 27, 1991. S. 337–342.
 Sebastián Apesteguía, Hussam Zaher:  In:  440, 2006. , S. 1037–1040.
 Judy Gail Armstrong-Ziegler:  In:  52 (2), 1978. S. 480–483.
 Marc Augé, Jean-Claude Rage:  In:  92, 2006. , S. 235–253.
 Richard Estes: In:  50, 1976. S. 500–520.
 Richard C. Fox:  In:  12, 1975. S. 1557–1563.
 James D. Gardner, Richard L. Cifelli:  In: David M. Unwin:  60, 1999. S. 87–100.
 Robert Hoffstetter:  In: Jean Piveteau:  Masson, Paris 1955. S. 606–662
 J. Alan Holman:  Indiana University Press, Bloomington 2000. .
 Nicholas R. Longrich, Bhart-Anjan S. Bhullar, Jacques A. Gauthier:  In: Nature, 2012. , S. 1–4.
 Nicholas R. Longrich, Bhart-Anjan S. Bhullar, Jacques A. Gauthier:  In: Nature, 2012. , S. 1–10.
 Othniel Charles Marsh:  In:  43, 1892. S. 449–453.
 Paul Orman McGrew, Max K. Hecht, John M. Hummel, George Gaylord Simpson, Albert Elmer Wood:  In:  117, 1959. S. 117–176. (Volltext)
 Jean-Claude Rage:  In: Palaeontographica Abteilung A 25, 1988. S. 3–27.
 Jean-Claude Rage, C. Werner:  In: Palaeontologia Africana 35, 1999. S. 85–110.
 Jean-Claude Rage, Guntupalli V.R. Prasad, Sunil Bajpai:  In:  25, 2004. , S. 425–434.
 Jean-Claude Rage, Marc Augé:  In: Geobios 42, 2010. , 253–268.

Cretaceous snakes
Eocene snakes
Turonian genus first appearances
Priabonian extinctions
Cretaceous–Paleogene boundary
Late Cretaceous reptiles of Africa
Late Cretaceous reptiles of Asia
Fossils of India
Late Cretaceous reptiles of North America
Cretaceous Canada
Cretaceous United States
Fossils of Canada
Fossils of the United States
Eocene reptiles of Africa
Fossils of Morocco
Eocene reptiles of Europe
Eocene France
Fossils of France
Paleocene reptiles of North America
Paleogene United States
Paleocene reptiles of South America
Paleocene Bolivia
Fossils of Bolivia
Tiupampan
Eocene Brazil
Fossils of Brazil
Itaboraian
Fossil taxa described in 1892
Taxa named by Othniel Charles Marsh
Paleocene reptiles of Africa
Eocene reptiles of North America
Eocene reptiles of South America
Paleocene snakes
Cretaceous India
Cretaceous Sudan